"Stillness of Heart" is a song written by Lenny Kravitz and Craig Ross. The song was included on Kravitz's 2001 album, Lenny, and was released as a single on January 14, 2002. "Stillness of Heart" charted at number 38 on the US Billboard Modern Rock Tracks charts, number 22 on the Canadian Singles Chart, and number 16 on the Italian Singles Chart.

Track listings

Canadian CD single
 "Stillness of Heart" (edit) – 3:48
 "Flowers for Zöe" (acoustic version) – 2:46

UK CD single
 "Stillness of Heart" (edit) – 3:48
 "Stillness of Heart" (acoustic version) – 4:20
 "Flowers for Zöe" (acoustic version) – 2:46

European CD single
 "Stillness of Heart" – 4:15
 "Flowers for Zöe" (acoustic version) – 2:46

European DVD single
 "Stillness of Heart" (video) – 3:48
 "Stillness of Heart" (rock remix audio) – 3:58
 "God Is Love" (acoustic version) – 4:26
 Bonus DVD footage

Australian CD single
 "Stillness of Heart" – 4:15
 "Stillness of Heart" (acoustic version) – 4:20
 "Flowers for Zöe" (acoustic version) – 2:46
 "Dig In" (video) – 4:07

Charts

Weekly charts

Year-end charts

Release history

References

Lenny Kravitz songs
2001 songs
2002 singles
Song recordings produced by Lenny Kravitz
Songs written by Lenny Kravitz
Songs written by Craig Ross
Virgin Records singles